Jadwiga Grabowska-Hawrylak (born October 29, 1920 – died June 4, 2018) was a Polish architect active between 1954 and 1993. She is known for designing housing and schools, and for her contributions to the post-WWII reconstruction of Wrocław.

Life 
She was born in Tarnawce. She grew up in Przemyśl, in southeastern Poland, as the daughter of two teachers. She graduated from high school in 1939.

In 1945, after World War II, she moved to Wrocław. The city had been within German borders since 1740, but was returned to Poland after the war, when 60% of it was in ruins. Rebuilding the city was secondary to rebuilding the more thoroughly destroyed capital of Warsaw, and did not begin until 1952.

In 1950, Grabowska-Hawrylak graduated from the Wrocław University of Technology, after having completed a thesis on interior design. Her first professional work was a historic reconstruction of Burgher houses in Wrocław's market square. She joined Miastoproject-Wrocław, the government-operated architectural group for the city, and worked on residential projects in the city center. Her work – especially "Manhattan", the residential estate at Plac Grunwaldzki, perhaps her best-known project – became emblematic of Brutalism, but unintentionally so: her planned white balconies filled with greenery were built with gray concrete and left unpainted.

Her unbuilt works include a tourist center in Como, Italy, residential development in Manila, the Philippines, and a New Urbanist housing estate in Oleśnica, in southwestern Poland.

After decades in architecture, she began quilting in the 1980s. Her last project was the postmodern Millennium Memorial Church of the Diocese of Wrocław, built in 1996.

Awards and legacy 
Grabowska-Hawrylak was the first female graduate in Wrocław after World War II. In 1974, she became the first woman to be awarded the Honorary Award of the Association of Polish Architects (SARP), the most prestigious architectural award in the country. In 1972, she received the Gold Cross of Merit and in 1989 the Commander's Cross of the Order of Polonia Restituta.

The American Institute of Architects' Center for Architecture hosted a retrospective exhibition titled "Patchwork: The Architecture of Jadwiga Grabowska-Hawrylak" in 2019.

Personal life 
Her husband was Henryk Hawrylak, a mining machinery specialist. She had three children: Katarzyna, Maciej, and Paweł.

Notable works

See also
Architecture of Poland
List of Polish architects

References

Wrocław University of Technology alumni
People from Przemyśl County
Women architects
Polish women architects
20th-century Polish architects
1920 births
2018 deaths